The Excise Act 1976, is a Malaysian law enacted to amend and consolidate the law pertaining to excise in Malaysia.

Structure
The Excise Act 1976, in its current form (1 January 2006), consists of 16 Parts containing 92 sections and 1 schedule (including 12 amendments).
 Part I: Preliminary
 Part II: Appointment of Officers
 Part III: Levying of Excise Duties
 Part IV: Manufacture of Dutiable Goods
 Part V: Storage of Dutiable Goods
 Part VI: Petroleum and Petroleum Products
 Part VII: Licensing
 Part VIII: Toddy
 Part VIIIA: General Provisions Affecting Vessels in Territorial Waters
 Part VIIIB: Declaration of Goods
 Part IX: Miscellaneous Provisions
 Part X: Inspection, Investigation, Search, Seizure and Arrest
 Part XI: Provisions as to Trials and Proceedings
 Part XII: Offences and Penalties
 Part XIII: Regulations
 Part XIV: Special Provisions Dealing with Labuan
 Part XV: Special Provisions Dealing with Sabah and Sarawak
 Part XVA: Special Provisions Dealing with Langkawi
 Part XVB: Special Provisions Dealing with Tioman
 Part XVC: Special Provisions Dealing with the Joint Development Area
 Part XVI: Repeal
 Schedule

References

External links
 Excise Act 1976 

1976 in Malaysian law
Malaysian federal legislation